Samantha Sanders (born 21 August 1983) is a South African professional racing cyclist. She rode in the women's road race at the 2016 UCI Road World Championships, finishing in 41st place.

References

External links
 

1983 births
Living people
South African female cyclists
Place of birth missing (living people)
21st-century South African women